The Rally of Discovery is a motorcycle rally held in the Republic of Ireland and other locales. It was started in 1994 by the Southern Motorcycle Adventure Club.

The Purpose of the Rally of Discovery is to keep in contact with the riders who take part, or have an interest in these international motorcycle adventure and navigation rallies i.e. to use motorcycles, normally trail motorcycles to explore your local area.

The first Rally started in Cork outside Isaacs Hostel, where most of the entrants stayed the night before.
In the following years the event has started in different locations and latterly it has moved overseas from Ireland to keep the adventure fresh.

Locations

1994 - Cork City Ireland 
1995 - Ireland
1996 - Ireland
1997 - Ireland
1998 - Ireland
1999 - Ireland
2000 - Ireland
2001 - Crete - Rally of Discovery - Island of Crete 
2002 - Clare Navigation Rallye Republuc of Ireland
2003 - Trip to Tipp - Rally of Discovery - Clonmel Ireland
2004 - Welsh Rally of Discovery - Wales
2004 - Andalucia Adventure - Rally of Discovery - South of Spain 
2005 - Wales -  Rally of Discovery - Wales 
2006 - Cyprus - Rally of Discovery Cyprus paphos
2006 - Cornwall - Rally of Discovery Cornwall
2007 - Yorkshire - Forest Moor & Coast, Yorkshire Rally of Discovery 
2007 - Isle of Man - Manx Rally of Discovery 
2008 - Surrey Hills - Rally of Discovery UK 3/5 May 2008
2008 - Ireland - Lisdoonvarna Rally of Discovery 05 - 08  Sept 2008

External links
 Rally of Discovery official website

Motorcycle rallies in the United Kingdom